Jan Ščotka (born May 20, 1996) is a Czech professional ice hockey player. He is currently playing for HC Litvínov of the Czech Extraliga.

Ščotka made his Czech Extraliga debut playing with HC Pardubice during the 2014–15 Czech Extraliga season.

Career statistics

International

References

External links

1996 births
Living people
HC Dynamo Pardubice players
Czech ice hockey defencemen
People from Vsetín
Sportspeople from the Zlín Region
Czech expatriate ice hockey players in Finland
HC Kometa Brno players
HC Litvínov players
JYP Jyväskylä players